MTV VMA Score 2005 is a two-part soundtrack album for the 2005 MTV Video Music Awards. The score was written and produced by Mike Shinoda and Lil Jon. An EP was released on August 31, 2005 in support of the award function. The soundtrack was available for download on the website of MTV during 2005-2006, but the whole album was not available anywhere, so Shinoda released it separately for streaming on his official website on March 1, 2010.

Background
This is the first score by Shinoda, as well as Lil Jon. This was released during the period when Linkin Park went on hiatus and Shinoda was working on his side project Fort Minor from 2004-2006. In response to a January 2010 post on LPLive about the unreleased VMA tracks, on March 1, 2010, Mike posted on his blog,

Mike Shinoda invited his fans to sing or rap on these songs posted on his website. The SoundCloud page said,

Content
In the score release, fans were treated to new score tracks as well as longer versions of the ones that were released by MTV. The unreleased track from the MTV VMA's turned out to be "Teletronic", and the one from the LPU 9 video called "Catharsis".

In EP, the opening song is a short instrumental version of the song "100 Degrees", which was written by Shinoda from his Fort Minor mixtape We Major. A long version of the song was used in the score and the name was changed to "Hive". The song "Hype" was also released in the limited edition of the EP by Fort Minor, entitled Militia.

In the score album, there was an unreleased track, which is not yet known. It was also not included by Shinoda in score. It was going to be the third track of the score.

Track listing

The EP

The Score

References

External links
Official Awards Website

Lil Jon albums
Albums produced by Mike Shinoda
Albums produced by Lil Jon
2005 EPs
2010 albums
Film scores